As part of the sanctions which have been imposed on the Russian Federation as a result of the Russo-Ukrainian War, on 2 September 2022, finance ministers of the G7 group of nations agreed to cap the price of Russian oil and petroleum products in an effort which was intended to reduce Russia's ability to finance its war on Ukraine and curb further increases in the 2021–2022 inflation surge.

The sanctions against buying Russian oil products take effect on 5 February 2023, introduced as part of the sixth package of restrictions, and they are designed to complement the sanctions and price cap on Russian oil which were introduced in December 2022. It is believed that as the EU imports a greater proportion of Russian exported refined oil than crude oil, the impact of this new sanction will be greater. 

In 2022, the Russian Federation was cushioned against oil and gas-based sanction effects as a result of the global rise in oil and gas prices. The price cap sanction was introduced in an attempt to remove the cushion so the revenue which is earned by Russia is restricted and the price of it will not rise when world oil and gas product prices rise in the future.

Sanctions
Sanctions were effected on 5 February 2023 and apply to the following Russian oil products:
 High value (premium-to-crude products), including Gasoline (Petrol), Diesel fuel, Jet fuel/Kerosene
 Low value (discount-to-crude products), including Naptha, High Sulphur Fuel Oil (HSFO)

The G7 countries, plus the rest of the EU and Australia are amongst the main countries imposing the sanctions

As with the 2022 Russian oil price cap, sanctions come in two parts:

1) A ban by each sanctioning country on importing any Russian refined oil products.

2) Sanctions apply to anyone facilitating the maritime transport of refined oil products originating in Russia if the goods are not traded at or beneath the cap levels, including,Trading/commodities brokering, Financing, Shipping, Insurance, including reinsurance and protection and indemnity, Flagging and Customs brokering. 

A transitional period of 55 days is granted for vessels carrying Russian petroleum products, purchased and loaded prior to 5 February and unloaded prior to 1 April 2023.

Sanctions cease when the oil product is landed outside of Russian territory and handed to the purchaser or blending operations in a third country “result in a tariff shift” or changes in the oil product type.

Price Cap price
Within the EU, there had been a lengthy debate about the determination of a price cap for the various products with Poland and the Baltic countries wanting lower prices.

Price cap levels agreed by G7 and the EU on 3 February 2023:  The prices will be kept under review.
Premium-to-crude products, including diesel, kerosene and gasoline - US$100per barrel
Discount-to-crude products, including fuel oil - US$45per barrel

Reactions

The EU
Various EU countries have been increasing their stocks of oil products, especially diesel ahead of the sanction ban.

Russia
Russia is looking to try to change trade routes for their products. India and China are both exporters of oil products, so new markets will need to be found.

Effect of price cap sanctions

February 2023 
Russian produced diesel was reported to be selling for around $75 per barrel in February.

Exports by sea of Russian oil products fell 10.4% from 11.781m tons in January to 9.531m tons in February.

See also

External links
, OFAC Guidance on Implementation of the Price Cap Policy

References 

Sanctions and boycotts during the Russo-Ukrainian War
2020s in international relations
Foreign relations of Russia
International sanctions
Sanctions against Russia
Reactions to the 2022 Russian invasion of Ukraine